Hugo Pezet (born 20 October 2000) is a French rugby league footballer who plays as a  or  for Toulouse Olympique in the Betfred Championship.

He is a graduate of the Toulouse Olympique Academy system and signed his first professional contract for Toulouse in November 2021.

Background
Pezet was born in France and discovered rugby league in his hometown of Albi.

Club career

Early career
Pezet played in the junior ranks at Albi before joining the academy system at AS Carcassonne. He spent two years at Carcassonne before joining Toulouse in 2018.

Toulouse Olympique Broncos
Pezet made his debut playing at right centre in the 50–4 defeat at Carcassonne on 1 December 2018, the first day of Toulouse's 2018/19 Elite 1 season. and went on to play in 10 of Toulouse's 19 matches. In the 2019/20 season, Pezet played in 7 of 12 games in a shortened season cancelled due to COVID-19. His final game of the Elite 1 season was the 18–36 loss to Villeneuve before joining up with the first team for what turned out to be the final game of their aborted season. Pezet resumed playing rugby when the French Elite 1 season began (behind closed doors) on 1 November 2020. He played in 17 of the 18 games in 2020/21 season, before joining up with the first team once again.

Toulouse Olympique
Pezet made his debut for the Toulouse first team on 7 March 2020, scoring a try in the Round 5, 34–14 win against Batley at Stade Ernest Wallon. Due to COVID-19 the season was initially suspended after Round 5 and then subsequently cancelled with no more games being played.

Following the conclusion of the 2020/21 Elite 1 season in May, Pezet made three appearances for the first team in the 2021 RFL Championship coming off the bench each time. He scored a try away at Dewsbury Rams, and made further appearances at Wakefield against Sheffield Eagles and then away at Oldham.

On 5 November 2021 it was announced that he had signed his first professional contract and would be part of the Toulouse Olympique squad for their first ever Super League campaign in 2022.

Club statistics

International career

France U19s
Pezet was initially named in the France U19 squad for the 2018 U19s European Championships to be held in Serbia however he was replaced in the squad by Jayson Goffin and took no part in the tournament.

In July 2019, Pezet was named in a 35-man U19s train-on squad to play four games in New Zealand. Pezet made the reduced 24 man squad and toured New Zealand where France U19s played Canterbury U20s (won 32–28); Waikato U20s (won 28–18); New Zealand U18s (lost 44–26); and  Auckland (lost 38–26)

References

2000 births
Living people
Toulouse Olympique Broncos players
Toulouse Olympique players
French rugby league players
Rugby league centres
Rugby league second-rows